Love and Fall is the debut studio album by South Korean rapper Bobby. The album consists of ten tracks, all written and composed by Bobby. Love and Fall was released on September 14, 2017, by YG Entertainment. The album features two lead singles, "I Love You" and "Runaway".

Track listing

Charts

Sales

Release history

References

2017 debut albums
YG Entertainment albums
Korean-language albums
Bobby (rapper) albums